Natural food and all-natural food are terms in food labeling and marketing with several definitions, often implying foods that are not manufactured by processing. In some countries like the United Kingdom, the term "natural" is defined and regulated; in others, such as the United States, the term natural is not enforced for food labels, although there is USDA regulation of organic labeling.

The term is assumed to describe foods having ingredients that are intrinsic to an unprocessed food.

Diverse definitions
While almost all foodstuffs are derived from the natural products of plants and animals, 'natural foods' are often assumed to be foods that are not processed, or do not contain any food additives, or do not contain particular additives such as hormones, antibiotics, sweeteners, food colors, preservatives, or flavorings that were not originally in the food.  In fact, many people (63%) when surveyed showed a preference for products labeled "natural" compared to the unmarked counterparts, based on the common belief (86% of polled consumers) that the term "natural" indicated that the food does not contain any artificial ingredients.

The term is variously misused on labels and in advertisements. The international Food and Agriculture Organization's Codex Alimentarius does not recognize the term 'natural' but does have a standard for organic foods.

History

The idea of eating "natural foods" was promoted by cookbook writers in the United States during the 1970s with cookbooks emphasizing "natural," "health" and "whole" foods in opposition to processed foods which were considered bad for health. In 1971, Eleanor Levitt authored The Wonderful World of Natural Food Cookery which dismissed processed foods such as readymade dinners, cookie mixes, and cold cuts as being full of preservatives and other "chemical poisons."

Jean Hewitt authored the New York Times Natural Foods Cookbook, an influential cookbook on the use of natural foods. Hewitt suggested that before large-scale mechanized farming and modern food production methods, people ate "fresh, natural and unrefined foods for granted" and but have since abandoned this way of eating for highly processed foods which are devoid of flavor and nutrition. Hewitt's cookbook offered "the textures, tastes and nutritional benefits of the natural, fresh foods that grandmother knew" and dedicated the recipes to "the thousands of people across the country who believe in, and practice, the natural way of eating for good health".

Definition by process and by product

United Kingdom
In the United Kingdom, the Food Standards Agency has published criteria for the use of several terms in food labeling. The guidance, in general, restricts the use of natural foods that have "ingredients produced by nature, not the work of man or interfered with by man." Natural flavorings are explicitly defined by separate laws.

There are different standards for various types of food, such as dairy products.  It also gives standards for some food processing techniques, such as fermentation or pasteurization.  The standard explicitly rules out "foods derived from novel processes, GM or cloning."

Definition by process only

Canada
The Canadian Food Inspection Agency restricts the use of "natural" to foods that have not been significantly altered by processing and gives examples of processes that do or do not significantly alter food.  This includes two specific additional requirements:

A natural food or ingredient of a food is not expected to contain, or ever to have contained, an added vitamin, mineral nutrient, artificial flavoring agent or food additive.
A natural food or ingredient of a food does not have any constituent or fraction thereof removed or significantly changed, except the removal of water.

Israel
A specific ingredient can be called "natural" if it did not go through any processing except for the listed ones. The whole food can be called "natural" if the food is not a blend of foods (even if they are all-natural), has no added ingredients, and underwent only the specified processes.

Lack of definition

United States

FSIS is a subsection of the United States Department of Agriculture (USDA), which is tasked with the responsibility of "ensuring that the nation's commercial supply of meat, poultry, and egg products is safe, wholesome, and correctly labeled and packaged." The USDA partnered with the Food and Drug Administration (FDA) to develop and issue regulations against the inappropriate usage of "natural" labels; yet, the FDA does not have specific rules for "natural" labeling. It advised on their website "the agency has not objected to the use of the term if the food does not contain added color, artificial flavors, or synthetic substances."

Furthermore, the FDA has not developed any rules or regulations on the defining features of what qualifies a product as "natural". The FDA does reference a definition of "natural" in their informal policy (Ref. 53) that defines "natural" as "nothing artificial or synthetic (including colors regardless of source) is included in, or has been added to, the product that would not normally be expected to be there."

The Food, Drug, and Cosmetic Act prohibits labeling that is false or misleading. The USDA has a standard for organic food called the National Organic Program. As of August 2005, the USDA had a section governing "natural claims" in its Food Standards and Labeling Policy Book.

The poultry industry has been criticized by the Center for Science in the Public Interest for labeling chicken meat "all-natural" after it has been injected with saline solution up to 25% of its weight. There is no legal recourse to prevent this labeling.

See also

 List of organic food topics
 Organic food culture

References

Food packaging
Food processing
Food retailing
foods
Product certification